Annette Peters (née Hand; born May 31, 1965) is an American long-distance runner. She competed in the women's 3000 metres at the 1992 Summer Olympics. She was a four-time participant at the IAAF World Cross Country Championships and a three-time participant at the World Championships in Athletics. She was the 3000-meter run bronze medalist at the 1994 Goodwill Games.

References

External links
 

1965 births
Living people
Sportspeople from Reno, Nevada
Track and field athletes from Nevada
American female long-distance runners
American female cross country runners
Olympic track and field athletes of the United States
Athletes (track and field) at the 1992 Summer Olympics
World Athletics Championships athletes for the United States
Goodwill Games medalists in athletics
Competitors at the 1994 Goodwill Games
21st-century American women